Katten Muchin Rosenman LLP (Katten) is a full-service law firm with nearly 700 attorneys in locations across the United States, London and Shanghai. The firm's core areas of practice include commercial finance, corporate, financial markets and funds, insolvency and restructuring, intellectual property, litigation, real estate, structured finance and securitization, transactional tax planning, and private wealth. Katten represents public and private companies in numerous industries, as well as a number of government and nonprofit organizations and individuals.

The firm was formed on December 31, 2002 through the merger of Chicago-based Katten Muchin & Zavis (founded in 1974) and New York City-based Rosenman & Colin (founded in 1912).

Rankings and recognition
Katten is regularly honored for its diversity and women's programs by legal publications such as MultiCultural Law Magazine, mainstream publications such as Working Mother magazine  and by business groups such as the National Association for Female Executives "NAFE" rankings of Top 50 Companies for Executive Women. Katten has been named one of the “Best Places to Work for LGBT Equality” by the Human Rights Campaign every year since 2009 and by Equality Illinois as one of the top Illinois law firms for LGBT inclusiveness and equality every year since 2012. The firm has been recognized by the Leadership Council on Legal Diversity (LCLD) as a Top Performer and recipient of the Compass Award in 2018 and 2019.

Katten has been certified for meeting the standards of the Mansfield Rule 2.0, which directs law firms to consider at least 30 percent women, LGBTQ+ and minority attorneys for significant leadership roles. The Mansfield Rule, a winning idea from the 2016 Women in Law Hackathon hosted by Diversity Lab in collaboration with Bloomberg Law and Stanford Law School, was inspired by the NFL's Rooney Rule, which requires NFL teams to interview at least one minority candidate for head coach vacancies. Diversity Lab's Mansfield Rule was named after Arabella Mansfield, the first woman admitted to practice law in the United States, and measures whether law firms have considered historically underrepresented attorneys for at least 30 percent of leadership and governance roles, equity partner promotions, and lateral positions. The firm is currently participating in the third version of the Mansfield Rule, which broadens the candidate pool to add attorneys with disabilities.

Katten's attorneys and practices have been ranked in the BTI Litigation Outlook, Chambers Global, Chambers USA, Chambers UK, The Legal 500 United States, The Legal 500 United Kingdom and US News – Best Lawyers “Best Law Firms.” 2018 as a top-tier Honor Roll firm in the areas of IP Litigation, Class Actions, Securities and Finance Litigation, and Complex Employment Litigation. The firm's Trusts and Estates practice has been recognized as an industry leader in the Chambers High Net Worth 2017 guide for top talent and cross-border excellence.

Katten has been highly ranked for US ABS/MBS Securitizations and CLO Underwriting Counsel. The firm was ranked second place for a fourth year among the most active issuers' counsel for US asset-backed and mortgage-backed securitizations and is in the top 10 of underwriters' counsel for US asset-backed and mortgage-backed securitizations. Its Commercial Finance practice was named one of the top 10 dealmakers of 2017 and 2018 by Franchise Times, advising on more than 75 deals annually in the franchise and restaurant space, with loan sizes ranging from $25 million to more than $800 million. Katten has been recognized for its trademark services by World Trademark Review 1000 – The World's Leading Trademark Professionals (WTR 1000). The firm's Sports and Sports Facilities practice was selected as a “go-to” firm for Sports Law in Chicago.

Notable attorneys and alumni
 Richard M. Daley former Mayor of Chicago joined the firm on June 1, 2011,

References

External links
 The National Law Review profile

Law firms based in Chicago
Law firms established in 2002
2002 establishments in the United States